Ragnhild Rød, née Ragnhild Gunnerson Welhaven (22 August 1884 – ??) was a Norwegian politician for the Conservative Party.

She was born in Kristiania as a son of clergyman Sven Rudolf Gunnerson (1844–1904) and Elise Margrethe Cammermeyer Welhaven (1850–1936). Her father had americanized his name from Gundersen to Gunnerson, while working as a theologian in the United States. Her maternal grandmother was Anthone Johanne Holmboe, a daughter of Michael Wide Holmboe. As such Ragnhild Rød was a great-great-granddaughter of Jens Holmboe. Her maternal grandfather was Johan Ernst Welhaven, Jr. (1818–1883), a brother of Maren, Elisabeth and Johan Sebastian Welhaven. Ragnhild Rød was a second cousin of her father's cousin's daughter Sigri Welhaven.

Rød was a member of Halden city council from 1931 to 1940, and also after the Second World War. She was a member of the school board from 1926 to 1928 and 1932 to 1938, and of the cinematographer's board from 1938 to 1940 and after the war. She was a deputy representative to the Parliament of Norway from the Market towns of Østfold and Akershus counties during the term 1937–1945, and met briefly in the place of Robert Rafn.

References

1884 births
Year of death missing
People from Halden
Østfold politicians
Conservative Party (Norway) politicians
Deputy members of the Storting